John Neeson was a Scottish amateur football outside right who played in the Scottish League for Queen's Park and Dumbarton. He was capped by Scotland at amateur level.

References 

Scottish footballers
Scottish Football League players
Queen's Park F.C. players
Association football outside forwards
Scotland amateur international footballers
Year of birth missing
Place of birth missing
Dumbarton F.C. players